French legislative elections to elect the 15th legislature of the French Third Republic were held on 1 and 8 May 1932.

These elections saw the victory of the second Cartel des gauches, but the socialists and Radicals could not form a coalition government. Édouard Herriot instead formed a government with the support of the centre-right, and Radicals held the premiership up to the 6 February 1934 crisis.

Results

Popular vote

|-
!style="background-color:#E9E9E9" align=left valign=top colspan="2"|Alliance
!style="background-color:#E9E9E9" align=right|Votes
!style="background-color:#E9E9E9" align=right|%
!style="background-color:#E9E9E9" align=left valign=top colspan="2"|Party
!style="background-color:#E9E9E9" align=right|Abbr.
!style="background-color:#E9E9E9" align=right|Votes
!style="background-color:#E9E9E9" align=right|%
|-
|style="background-color:#E75480" rowspan="4"|  
|align=left rowspan="4"|Cartel des Gauches
|rowspan="4"| 4,394,963
|rowspan="4"| 45.89
|style="background-color:#E75480"|
|align=left| French Section of the Workers' International (Section française de l'Internationale ouvrière)
|align=right| SFIO
|align=right|1,964,384
|align=right|20.51
|-
|style="background-color:#FFBF00"|
|align=left| Republican, Radical and Radical-Socialist Party (Parti républicain, radical et radical-socialiste)
|align=right|PRRRS
|align=right|1,836,991
|align=right|19.18
|-
|style="background-color:#DE3163"|
|align=left| Republican-Socialist Party (Parti républicain-socialiste)
|align=right|PRS
|align=right|515,176
|align=right|5.38
|-
|style="background-color:#DA7B8B"|
|align=left| Miscellaneous Left independents (Divers gauche)
|align=right|DVG
|align=right|78,412
|align=right|0.82
|-
|style="background-color:blue" rowspan="6"|  
|align=left rowspan="6"|Right and Centre
|rowspan="6"| 4,380,717
|rowspan="6"| 45.74
|style="background-color:#FBEC5D"|
|align=left| Independent Radicals (Radicaux indépendents)
|align=right|RI
|align=right|955,990
|align=right|9.98
|-
|style="background-color:#0080FF"|
|align=left| Democratic Alliance (Alliance démocratique)
|align=right|AD
|align=right|1,299,936
|align=right|13.57
|-
|style="background-color:#00CCCC"|
|align=left| Popular Democrats (Démocrates populaires)
|align=right|PDP
|align=right|309,336
|align=right|3.36
|-
|style="background-color:#0000C8"|
|align=left| Republican Federation (Fédération républicaine)
|align=right|FR
|align=right|1,233,360
|align=right|12.88
|-
|style="background-color:#00008B"|
|align=left| Independents (Indépendents)
|align=right|Ind
|align=right|499,236
|align=right|5.21
|-
|style="background-color:blue"|
|align=left| Conservatives
|align=right|Con
|align=right|82,859
|align=right|0.87
|-
|style="background-color:#FF0000"|
|colspan=5 align=left| French Communist Party (Parti communiste français)
|align=right|PCF
|align=right|796,630
|align=right|8.32
|-
|style="background-color:gray"|
|colspan=5 align=left| Other parties
|align=right|Div
|align=right|4,112
|align=right|0.04
|-
|align=left colspan=7|Total
|align=right|9,576,422
|align=right|100
|-
|colspan=9 align=left|Abstention: 18.41%
|}

Parliamentary groups

References

External links
Map of Deputies elected in 1932 according to their group in the House, including overseas (in french)

1932
1932 elections in France